Arctomeekoceras is a genus of ammonoids in the order Ceratitida from the Early Triassic, included in the Meekoceratidae; a family characterized by more of less involute, compressed, discoidal forms that are smooth or weakly ornamented and have a ceratitic suture with broad saddles.

Arctomeekoceras lived from about 250 to about 245 m.y.a and has been found in arctic Canada (Nunavut) in the Blind Fiord Formation associated with  Neomeekoceras, Olenikites, and  Pseudosageceras; and in far northern Siberia, Russian Federation, associated with Boreomeekoceras, Pseudosageceras,  Olenikites,  Keyserlingites, Sibirites, Nordophiceras, Olenekoceras, and Subolenekites

References 

 Arkell, et al. Mesozoic Ammonoidea; Treatise on Invertebrate Paleontology, Part L, Ammonoidea. Geol Soc of America and Univ Kansas press, 1957, R. C. Moore (ed)
  Arctomeekoceas -  Paleobiology.
 Axel Heiberg Island Paleofauna. 
 Mengilyakh Creek Paleofauna  

Meekoceratidae
Extinct animals of Russia
Ceratitida genera
Early Triassic ammonites
Extinct animals of Canada